László Kuti (born 23 October 1954) is a former Hungary international football forward who played for clubs in Hungary, Turkey and Austria.

Career
Born in Székesfehérvár, Kuti started playing youth football for local side Szabadegyháza FC. He turned professional with Videoton FC in 1973. He moved to Dunaújváros FC in 1976 and would spend four seasons with the club. Kuti spent the following five seasons with Budapest Honvéd FC, winning the Hungarian league in the 1984–85 season.

In 1985, Kuti moved to Turkey, joining Süper Lig side Denizlispor. He made 19 league appearances for the club. A brief stint with FC Marchegg in the Austrian regional league followed.

Kuti made nine appearances for the Hungary national football team from 1979 to 1980.

References

External links
 
 

1954 births
Living people
Hungarian footballers
Hungary international footballers
Fehérvár FC players
Dunaújváros FC players
Budapest Honvéd FC players
Denizlispor footballers
Expatriate footballers in Turkey
Sportspeople from Székesfehérvár

Association football forwards
20th-century Hungarian people